Chelas Metro is a metro station on the Red Line of the Lisbon Metro. The station is located in Marvila, at the intersection of Av. Dr. Augusto de Castro and Rua Engenheiro Rodrigues de Carvalho, close to the Instituto Superior de Engenharia de Lisboa.

History
The project was designed by architect Ana Birth with installation art by plastic artist Jorge Martins.

Connections

Urban buses

Carris 
 208 Cais do Sodré ⇄ Estação Oriente (Interface) (morning service)
 718 ISEL ⇄ Al. Afonso Henriques 
 749 ISEL ⇄ Estação Entrecampos
 755  Poço do Bispo ⇄ Sete Rios
 759 Restauradores ⇄ Estação Oriente (Interface)
 794 Terreiro do Paço ⇄ Estação Oriente (Interface)

See also
 List of Lisbon metro stations

References

External links

Red Line (Lisbon Metro) stations
Railway stations opened in 1998